Shelby–Cleveland County Regional Airport  is a public use airport located three nautical miles (6 km) southwest of the central business district of Shelby, in Cleveland County, North Carolina, United States. It is owned by the City of Shelby and was formerly known as Shelby Municipal Airport. It is home to the Shelby Composite Squadron of the Civil Air Patrol, the USAF Civilian Auxiliary.

Although many U.S. airports use the same three-letter location identifier for the FAA and IATA, this facility is assigned EHO by the FAA but has no designation from the IATA. The airport's ICAO location indicator is KEHO.

Facilities and aircraft 
It has one runway designated 5/23 with an asphalt surface measuring 5,002 by 100 feet (1,525 x 30 m).

For the 12-month period ending August 6, 2008, the airport had 18,200 aircraft operations, an average of 49 per day: 99% general aviation and 1% military. At that time there were 32 aircraft based at this airport: 84% single-engine, 13% multi-engine and 3% helicopter.

References

External links 
 
 Aerial image as of 14 March 1998 from USGS The National Map
 

Airports in North Carolina
Buildings and structures in Cleveland County, North Carolina
Transportation in Cleveland County, North Carolina